Gabriela Annjane Umali Cruz (born August 17, 1996) and is professionally known as Ella Cruz, is a Filipino actress, product endorser, host, commercial & promotional model, and dancer.  She played the title character in the 2012 fantasy drama Aryana.

Career
She started her career in GMA Network in 2006, her first project being Majika. Cruz  moved to rival network, ABS-CBN in 2007. In 2009, she returned to GMA Network for Panday Kids and Ilumina. She once again moved to ABS-CBN to appear in Maalaala Mo Kaya, Cruz made another return to GMA Network in 2011, but later quickly moved to TV5 for Inday Wanda, but officially transferred to ABS-CBN & Star Magic as a contract artist.

She was known for playing the teen character of Cristine Reyes in the TV series Dahil Sa Pag-ibig. Cruz was often paired with Francis Magundayao who played the teen Piolo Pascual in the same TV series. She starred in Aryana as Philippines' first teen mermaid. She also played as a teen mom in Bagito.

She starred in several shows on TV5 like #ParangNormal Activity and played the role of Avah Chen in TV5's Wattpad Presents: Avah Maldita (Oh! Aarte pa?). She also became a host in a Sunday variety show, Happy Truck HAPPinas. Cruz made her last appearance as part of the Kapamilya Family in Ipaglaban Mo in 2016.

She recently became popular when a video of her dancing to "Twerk It Like Miley" turned viral on YouTube.

In 2017, she got her very first leading role in her movie Fangirl, Fanboy with Julian Trono. Within the same year, she alongside Trono published a book, under VRJ Books Publishing, entitled Jump In where past photos and stories of their love team, JulianElla, can be found, as well as some of the poems that Trono made for her on Twitter. Also, Cruz and her team Daphny Red and Eunice Creus were the representative in a Jakarta Indonesia Competition with South Korean girl group Blackpink.

In 2019, she returned to the Kapamilya network and is currently appearing as Lisa on Ang Probinsyano.

In 2022, she was cast to play the role of Imee Marcos in the upcoming film Maid in Malacañang, a historical drama telling an alternative account of the last 72 hours of the Marcos family in the Malacañang Palace before their exile to Hawaii in the wake of the People Power Revolution in 1986. The film is directed by Darryl Yap and produced by Viva Films. During an interview with The Philippine Star on July 2, 2022, in the context of the film, she described Philippine history as "tsismis" (gossip), calling it "filtered" and "biased", drawing controversy from Filipinos on social media.

She is currently a freelancer signed to Viva Artists Agency.

Filmography

Films

Awards and nominations

Singles

References

External links
 

Living people
Star Magic
People from Bulacan
Filipino film actresses
Filipino television actresses
Filipino child actresses
GMA Network personalities
ABS-CBN personalities
TV5 (Philippine TV network) personalities
Viva Artists Agency
1996 births